Mädchen, Mädchen 2 – Loft oder Liebe (Girls On Top 2) is a 2004 German-language comedic film directed by Peter Gersina. The movie is the second movie about Inken (Diana Amft) and her friend Lena (Karoline Herfurth) decide to go in search of a flat of their own after leaving home. The character Vicky from the first movie (played by Felicitas Woll) is not in this movie and a new friend Lucy (Jasmin Gerat) is an added character. They despair at the price of property in Munich and decide to try to find a rich man to help them in their exploits.

The movie is available on DVD.

External links

2004 films
2000s sex comedy films
2000s teen films
German sex comedy films
2000s German-language films
Films set in Munich
2004 comedy films
2000s German films